Endre Bálint (1914 – 1986, in Budapest) was a Hungarian painter and graphic artist.

Paintings Pre 1960
 My Room at the Bindendorfs 1937
 Self-portrait 1942
 Still-life 1946
 House at Szentendre 1948
 Root Dance 1952
 Stone Bird 1952
 Statue in a Cemetery 1959
 Houses at Hastings 1959
 Homesickness 1959

References

Hungarian illustrators
1914 births
1986 deaths
Artists from Budapest
20th-century Hungarian painters
20th-century Hungarian male artists
Hungarian male painters